Braia may refer to:

 Braia, a village in the commune Bastia Mondovì, Piedmont, Italy
 Braia (river), a tributary of the Jiul de Vest in Hunedoara County, Romania
 Braia, a tributary of the Argeș in Argeș County, Romania